Suicide Rock (once Suicide Peak) is a granite outcrop near Idyllwild, California, which is popular with rock climbers. Over three hundred climbing routes have been described. It is located near Tahquitz Peak.

According to legend, the name of Suicide Rock comes from a story of a Native American princess and her lover who, after being ordered to separate, instead committed suicide by jumping off the rock. It is speculated that this story originated as a derivative of Helen Hunt Jackson's Ramona story, in an attempt to boost tourism to this area in the late 19th century.

References

External links
 http://www.idyllwild.com/suicide.html Idyllwild.com]
 Rockclimbing.com

Climbing areas of California
Rock formations of California
San Jacinto Mountains
Landforms of Riverside County, California